The Chinese Ambassador to Belgium is the official representative of the People's Republic of China to the Kingdom of Belgium.

List of representatives

References 

Ministry of Foreign Affairs of the People's Republic of China, Chinese Ambassadors to Belgium, 驻比利时王国历任大使  </ref>

 
Belgium
China